Chothe Naga may refer to:
 Chothe people (Chothe Naga people) 
 Chothe language (Chothe Naga language)